Roland Jorz, OP (some sources Jorse) was a mediaeval Archbishop of Armagh

He was consecrated on 13 November 1311; and resigned before 22 August 1322. He acted as a suffragan bishop in the dioceses of the Diocese of Canterbury in 1323, and the  Diocese of York in 1332.

References

14th-century Roman Catholic archbishops in Ireland
Archbishops of Armagh